Kliment Nastoski (Macedonian: Kлимент Настоски, born 20 April 1987) is a footballer from Macedonia. He is a versatile player capable of playing both as a defensive and attacking central midfielder. He currently plays for Grenchen in the Swiss Solothurner Kantonal-Fussballverband.

Club career
He was born in Ohrid. After playing in the youth teams of FK Partizan, he begin his senior career playing with another Serbian club FK Dinamo Vranje. In 2007, he returned to Macedonia and signed with Macedonian First League club FK Pobeda where he stayed two seasons. In summer 2009 he moved to FK Olimpik Sarajevo playing in the Premier League of Bosnia and Herzegovina, but next winter he moved to Slovenia, to NK Krško. Since January 2011 he will play with FK Metalurg Skopje in the Macedonian First League. In summer 2011 he moved to Albania, where he represented two clubs during the 2011–12 Albanian Superliga season, KS Pogradeci and Shkumbini Peqin. In summer 2012 he moved to Greece and joined Football League side Anagennisi Epanomi F.C. He play now in 3 Swiss league for Old Boys.

International career
He regularly represented the youth teams of Macedonia, but has not made a senior team debut.

Honours
Metalurg Skopje
Macedonian Cup: 2011

References

1987 births
Living people
Sportspeople from Ohrid
Macedonian footballers
Association football midfielders
FK Dinamo Vranje players
FK Pobeda players
FK Olimpik players
NK Krško players
FK Metalurg Skopje players
KS Pogradeci players
KS Shkumbini Peqin players
Anagennisi Epanomi F.C. players
FC Grenchen players
BSC Old Boys players
FC Solothurn players
Macedonian First Football League players
Premier League of Bosnia and Herzegovina players
Slovenian Second League players
Kategoria Superiore players
Football League (Greece) players
2. Liga Interregional players
Macedonian expatriate footballers
Expatriate footballers in Serbia
Macedonian expatriate sportspeople in Serbia
Expatriate footballers in Bosnia and Herzegovina
Macedonian expatriate sportspeople in Bosnia and Herzegovina
Expatriate footballers in Slovenia
Macedonian expatriate sportspeople in Slovenia
Expatriate footballers in Albania
Macedonian expatriate sportspeople in Albania
Expatriate footballers in Greece
Macedonian expatriate sportspeople in Greece
Expatriate footballers in Switzerland
Macedonian expatriate sportspeople in Switzerland